Miss America 1989, the 62nd Miss America pageant, was held at the Boardwalk Hall in Atlantic City, New Jersey on Saturday, September 10, 1988 and was televised by the NBC Network. The pageant was moved a week early because of the 1988 Summer Olympics.

The winner, Minnesota's Gretchen Carlson, would later become a notable television journalist for Fox News & would later become the Chairwoman for the Miss America Organization.

Results

Order of announcements

Top 10

Top 2

Awards

Preliminary awards

Non-finalist awards

Judges
Walter Anderson
Brian Boitano
Joyce Brothers
Richard Dysart
William Farley
Eileen Ford
Eva Gabor
Phyllis George
Deborah Norville
George Peppard
Blair Underwood
Lili Fini Zanuck

Candidates

Further reading

External links
 Miss America official website

1989
1988 in the United States
1989 beauty pageants
1988 in New Jersey
September 1988 events in the United States
Events in Atlantic City, New Jersey